Tongda Lisu Ethnic Township is an ethnic township in Huaping County, Yunnan, China.

Administrative division 
As of 2016, the township is divided into five villages: 
 Tongda
 Weixin
 Shuanglong
 Dingwang
 Baiguhe

History 
During the early Republic of China, it belonged to the West District. The Qilian Township was set up in 1931.

After the establishment of the Communist State, in 1951, Xinabng Township and Qilian Township merged to form the 4th District. In 1961, it was renamed "Xinzhuang People's Commune". Its name was changed to Tongda Lisu Ethnic Township in 1988.

Geography 
The township is situated at the western Huaping County.

The Baigu River, Heitang River and Weixing River flow through the township.

There are two reservoirs in the township, namely the Liangjiawan Reservoir and Heitang Reservoir.

Climate 

Economy 
The township's economy is based on agriculture, animal husbandry, and nearby mineral resources. The main crops are rice, wheat, corn, sweet potato and vegetable. Economic crops are mainly citrus, walnut, zanthoxylum, apple, peach, cherry, and plum. The region abounds with coal, granite, feldspar, clay, and gypsum.

Demographics 

As of 2017, the National Bureau of Statistics of China estimates the township's population now to be 8,317.

Transportation 
The G4216 Expressway passes across the township.

References

Bibliography 

Divisions of Huaping County